The mushroom goby (Ponticola eurycephalus) is a species of goby native to the Black Sea where it can be found along the coasts from Bulgaria to the Crimea.  Mostly a species of marine and brackish waters, it is known to enter fresh waters in the delta of the Danube River.  This species prefers inshore waters with rocks or fallen trees.  This species can reach a length of  TL.

References

External links
 Marine Species Identification Portal

Ponticola
Fish of Europe
Fish of Western Asia
Fish of the Black Sea
Taxa named by Karl Kessler
Fish described in 1874